Cătunele is a commune in Gorj County, Oltenia, Romania. It is composed of six villages: Cătunele, Dealu Viilor, Lupoaia, Steic, Valea Mănăstirii and Valea Perilor.

References

Communes in Gorj County
Localities in Oltenia